(born 3 August 1962) is a racing cyclist from  Japan. He competed for Japan in the 1984 Summer Olympics held in Los Angeles, United States in the individual sprint event where he finished in third place.

References

1962 births
Living people
Japanese male cyclists
Olympic cyclists of Japan
Olympic bronze medalists for Japan
Cyclists at the 1984 Summer Olympics
Olympic medalists in cycling
Asian Games medalists in cycling
Cyclists at the 1982 Asian Games
Medalists at the 1984 Summer Olympics
Asian Games gold medalists for Japan
Medalists at the 1982 Asian Games